Sulejman "Sula" Rebac (29 March 1929 – 17 November 2006) was a Bosnian footballer and manager.

Playing career

Club
He started playing football at FK Velež Mostar in 1947. In 1954, he moved to HNK Hajduk Split where he stayed for several seasons. He also played one season for FK Sarajevo. In total, he played more than 1000 games, scoring 620 goals. He is considered to be one of the most celebrated football players in history of Velež and Bosnia and Herzegovina.

International
In 1956, Rebac made one appearance for the Croatian national team against Indonesia, in which he scored two goals.

Managerial career
After retirement, he began his coaching career. He started in 1963 as a coach of Velež Mostar. Although they had never won a title, Velež Mostar was among the top Yugoslav clubs at the time. Players like Dušan Bajević, Enver Marić, Franjo Vladić (the 'BMV' trio), Džemal Hadžiabdić, Vahid Halilhodžić, Aleksandar Ristić, Boro Primorac, Vladimir Pecelj, Momčilo Vukoje, Ahmed Glavović, Dubravko Ledić, Jadranko Topić, Marijan Kvesić, Marko Čolić and Slobodan Mrgan all made their names under the guidance of Sulejman Rebac. In the 1977–78 season, he was a coach of FK Željezničar Sarajevo.

In December 1973, he was appointed to a coaching commission, alongside Miljan Miljanić, Milan Ribar, Tomislav Ivić and Milovan Ćirić, created to lead the Yugoslavia national team. As a part of it, he was present at the 1974 FIFA World Cup.

Personal life

Death
Sulejman Rebac died on 17 November 2006 in Mostar.

Honours

Player
Velež Mostar 
Yugoslav Second League: 1952

Hajduk Split 
Yugoslav First League: 1954–55

Manager
Željezničar
Yugoslav Second League: 1977–78 (West)

References

1929 births
2006 deaths
Sportspeople from Mostar
Association football forwards
Yugoslav footballers
Bosnia and Herzegovina footballers
Croatia international footballers
FK Velež Mostar players
HNK Hajduk Split players
FK Sarajevo players
Yugoslav Second League players
Yugoslav First League players
Yugoslav football managers
Bosnia and Herzegovina football managers
FK Velež Mostar managers
Yugoslavia national football team managers
FK Željezničar Sarajevo managers
Yugoslav First League managers